Hallie Todd (born January 7, 1962) is an American actress. She played Penny Waters on Brothers, Jo McGuire on Lizzie McGuire, and Rhoda Markowitz, Dennis Stanton's assistant, on Murder, She Wrote. She also made guest-starring appearances on many other television shows such as The Golden Girls, Highway to Heaven, Malcom in the Middle, and Sabrina, the Teenage Witch.

Early life
Todd is the second child of actress Ann Morgan Guilbert and writer/producer George Eckstein. Her mother carried her to term while appearing on The Dick Van Dyke Show, although the pregnancy was not part of the story line and was covered up with loose fit clothing and close up camera angles. Todd attended Palisades Charter High School and the Pacific Conservatory of the Performing Arts.

Career
She played a homeless character, “The Kid,” on a Christmas episode of Growing Pains. She played Penny Waters, the daughter of fictional former football player Joe Waters on the Showtime comedy series Brothers, which is her longest lasting role. In 1990, a year after Brothers left the air, Todd moved into her next sitcom role as spunky writer-and-aspiring-comedian Kate Griffin on Going Places.

Later roles include Lal, Data's daughter on the Star Trek: The Next Generation episode "The Offspring"; Blanche's niece, Lucy, on The Golden Girls episode "Nice and Easy"; the mother in the Disney Channel original movie The Ultimate Christmas Present; Hilda's and Zelda's cousin Marigold, Amanda's mother, on Sabrina, the Teenage Witch; and as Lizzie's mother, Jo McGuire, on Lizzie McGuire.

She appeared in seven episodes of Murder, She Wrote, all but one as "Rhoda Markowitz", assistant to Keith Michell's sleuth, Dennis Stanton. Todd starred in the feature film The Mooring, which she co-wrote with her husband and daughter. The film was released on DVD, digital download and Video on Demand on February 19, 2013. Todd is the co-founder of the film production company In House Media and also teaches acting classes and privately coaches.

In 2016, Todd was seen starring in Universal's An American Girl: Lea to the Rescue. She was cast in The Last Champion, and will executive produce and perform in the film. Her husband, Glenn Withrow, is set to direct the project. He and Todd co-wrote the screenplay along with their daughter, Ivy Withrow, VP of Development for the company. In House Media Film Partners was born when Todd and Withrow were inspired to create a family production company after Withrow's experiences working with Francis Ford Coppola on five films, starting with The Outsiders.

Personal life
Todd is married to director/producer Glenn Withrow. They have a daughter, Ivy.

Filmography

Film

Television

Books
In between her acting roles, Todd wrote two books, Being Young Actors and Parenting The Young Actor.

References

External links

American film actresses
American television actresses
Living people
Actresses from Los Angeles
20th-century American actresses
21st-century American actresses
20th-century American writers
21st-century American writers
21st-century American women writers
20th-century American women writers
Year of birth missing (living people)